Steve Szabo (born September 11, 1943) is a former American football player and coach.  He played football and lacrosse for the United States Naval Academy from 1961 to 1965.  After four years of military service, Szabo held coaching positions with 18 collegiate and professional football teams from 1969 to 2011.  He served as the head football coach at Edinboro University of Pennsylvania from 1985 to 1987, compiling a record of 15–15–1.

Early years
A native of Chicago, Illinois, Szabo graduated from Mendel High School in Chicago.  He subsequently attended the United States Naval Academy, graduating in 1965. While attending the Naval Academy, Szabo played college football from 1961 to 1964 and played as a midfielder on Navy's national championship lacrosse teams from 1963 to 1965.  He played as fullback and defensive back on the same Navy football teams with Roger Staubach.  After graduating from the Naval Academy, Szabo served four years in the United States Marine Corps.  He was stationed at Marine Corps Base Quantico and served one year in South Vietnam.

Coaching career
Between 1969 and 2011, Szabo held coaching positions with 18 collegiate and professional football teams.  These include Johns Hopkins Blue Jays (defensive coordinator and defensive backfield, 1969), Toledo Rockets (freshman coach and chief scout, 1970), Iowa Hawkeyes (special teams and linebackers, 1971–1973), Syracuse Orange (defensive line, 1974–1976), Iowa State Cyclones (defensive line and kickers, 1977–1978), Ohio State Buckeyes (defensive line and kickers, 1979–1981), Western Michigan Broncos (assistant head coach and offensive coordinator, 1982–1984), Edinboro Fighting Scots (head coach, 1985–1987), Northern Iowa Panthers (defensive line, 1988), Colorado State Rams (defensive coordinator and linebackers, 1989–1990), Boston College Eagles (defensive coordinator and linebackers, 1991–1993), Jacksonville Jaguars (linebackers, 1994–2002), New England Patriots (volunteer assistant, 2003), Buffalo Bills (defensive backs, 2004–2005), Michigan Wolverines (linebackers, 2006–2007), Colgate Raiders (defensive coordinator and linebackers, 2008), Eastern Michigan Eagles (associate head coach and linebackers, 2009), and Illinois State Redbirds (defensive coordinator and linebackers, 2011),  Szabo resigned his position at Illinois State in June 2011 for personal reasons.

Head coaching record

References

1943 births
Living people
American football defensive backs
American football fullbacks
Boston College Eagles football coaches
Buffalo Bills coaches
Colgate Raiders football coaches
Colorado State Rams football coaches
Eastern Michigan Eagles football coaches
Edinboro Fighting Scots football coaches
Iowa Hawkeyes football coaches
Iowa State Cyclones football coaches
Jacksonville Jaguars coaches
Johns Hopkins Blue Jays football coaches
Michigan Wolverines football coaches
Navy Midshipmen football players
Navy Midshipmen men's lacrosse players
New England Patriots coaches
Northern Iowa Panthers football players
Ohio State Buckeyes football coaches
Syracuse Orange football coaches
Toledo Rockets football coaches
United States Marine Corps personnel of the Vietnam War
United States Marine Corps officers
Sportspeople from Chicago
Players of American football from Chicago
Educators from New York (state)
Educators from Illinois
Military personnel from Illinois